A Wedding Suit (Lebāsī Barāye Arūsī) is a 1976 Iranian comedy film directed by Abbas Kiarostami.

Film details
A woman orders a suit from a tailor for her young son to wear to her sister's wedding. The tailor's apprentice, together with two other teenage boys who work in the same building, devise a plan to try on the suit at night to see what it feels like. Things get a little complicated but in the morning, at the last possible minute, they manage to return the suit to its proper place.

See also
List of Iranian films

External links

Films directed by Abbas Kiarostami
Iranian comedy films
1976 films
1970s Persian-language films
1976 comedy films
Films set in Iran